W. L. Williams House is a registered historic building near Cincinnati, Ohio, listed in the National Register on March 25, 1977.

Historic uses 
Single Dwelling

Notes 

National Register of Historic Places in Cincinnati
Houses in Cincinnati
Houses on the National Register of Historic Places in Ohio